Gnatholepis is a genus of fish in the family Gobiidae, the gobies. It is the only marine genus in the subfamily Gobionellinae, which otherwise includes mostly estuary-dwelling and freshwater fish. Gnatholepis are tropical fish associated with sandy habitat around corals.

Species
There are currently 10 recognized species in this genus.

Species include:
 Gnatholepis anjerensis (Bleeker, 1851) (eye-bar goby)

 Gnatholepis argus Larson & Buckle, 2005
 Gnatholepis caudimaculata Larson & Buckle, 2012
 Gnatholepis cauerensis (Bleeker, 1853) (eyebar goby)
 Gnatholepis gymnocara J. E. Randall & D. W. Greenfield, 2001
 Gnatholepis knighti D. S. Jordan & Evermann, 1903
 Gnatholepis ophthalmotaenia (Bleeker, 1854)
 Gnatholepis pascuensis J. E. Randall & D. W. Greenfield, 2001 (Rapanui goby)
 Gnatholepis thompsoni D. S. Jordan, 1904 (goldspot goby)
 Gnatholepis yoshinoi T. Suzuki & J. E. Randall, 2009 (Yoshino's goby)

References

Further reading
Randall, John E. and Greenfield, David W. 2001. A preliminary review of the Indo-Pacific Gobiid fishes of the genus Gnatholepis. Ichthyological Bulletin J.L.B. Smith Institute of Ichthyology; No. 69. J.L.B. Smith Institute of Ichthyology, Rhodes University, Grahamstown, South Africa.

Gobionellinae
Marine fish genera
Taxa named by Pieter Bleeker